Walter Davis Pidgeon (September 23, 1897 – September 25, 1984) was a Canadian-American actor. He earned two Academy Award for Best Actor nominations for his roles in Mrs. Miniver (1942) and Madame Curie (1943). Pidgeon also starred in many films such as How Green Was My Valley (1941), The Bad and the Beautiful (1952), Forbidden Planet (1956), Voyage to the Bottom of the Sea (1961), Advise & Consent (1962), Funny Girl (1968), and Harry in Your Pocket (1973).

He received a star on the Hollywood Walk of Fame in 1960 and a Screen Actors Guild Life Achievement Award in 1975.

Early life
Born in Saint John, New Brunswick, Canada, Pidgeon was the son of Hannah (née Sanborn), a housewife, and Caleb Burpee Pidgeon, a haberdasher.

Pidgeon received his formal education in local schools and the University of New Brunswick, where he studied law and drama. His university education was interrupted by World War I when he volunteered with the 65th Battery, as a lieutenant in the Royal Regiment of Canadian Artillery. He never saw action, however, as he was severely injured in an accident when he was crushed between two gun carriages and spent seventeen months in a military hospital. His Officer Attestation states he was born in 1895 and further medical records state 1896. Following the war, he moved to Boston, Massachusetts, where he worked as a bank runner, at the same time studying voice at the Boston Conservatory of Music.

Career
While he was performing in amateur theatricals in Boston, Pidgeon was recommended to Elsie Janis, a prominent producer-actor-singer and impresario who was looking for a male singer for her revue. She hired him and Pidgeon moved to New York City in 1923. There he "managed to get an interview with E. E. Clive", a British producer then working on Broadway. Though his Broadway debut is often reported as 1925, in his chapter on Pidgeon in Once Upon a Time in Paradise: Canadians in the Golden Age of Hollywood (2003), Charles Foster quotes an interview with Pidgeon in which the actor corrects the date. "[Clive] was producing You Never Can Tell on Broadway, and despite my having a total lack of professional experience, he gave me a small role." Pidgeon made his first featured Broadway debut in Janis' 1925 revue, Puzzles of 1925.

Pidgeon's success in Elsie Janis' shows created a rift between them, leading to Pidgeon's eventual dismissaland his decision to head to Hollywood. After his first film, Mannequin, a silent drama (1925), Pidgeon went to make a number of silent films in the 1920s. Discouraged with the quality of the roles he was getting, Pidgeon returned to New York in 1928 to resume his theater career. It was with the arrival of the talkies that Pidgeon's movie career began its ascent, thanks to his singing voice. He starred in extravagant early Technicolor musicals, including Bride of the Regiment (1930), Sweet Kitty Bellairs (1930), Viennese Nights (1930) and Kiss Me Again (1931). Pidgeon continued to be in demand in singing roles through the 1930s, before making the transition to dramatic roles. In 1935 he took a break from Hollywood and did a stint on Broadway, appearing in the plays Something Gay, Night of January 16th, and There's Wisdom in Women.

When he returned to movies in 1937, it was as a dramatic actor, often cast in featured supporting roles in films like Saratoga (1937) and The Girl of the Golden West (1938). One of his better known roles was in Dark Command (1940), where he portrayed the villain (loosely based on American Civil War guerrilla William Quantrill) opposite John Wayne, Claire Trevor, and a young Roy Rogers.

It was not until he starred in the Academy Award-winning Best Picture How Green Was My Valley (1941) that his popularity reached its height. He then starred opposite Greer Garson in Blossoms in the Dust (1941), Mrs. Miniver (1942) (for which he was nominated for the Academy Award for Best Actor) and its sequel, The Miniver Story (1950). He was also nominated for Madame Curie (1943), again opposite Garson. His partnership with her continued throughout the 1940s and into the 1950s with Mrs. Parkington (1944), Julia Misbehaves (1948), That Forsyte Woman (1949), and finally Scandal at Scourie (1953). He also starred as Chip Collyer in the comedy Week-End at the Waldorf (1945) and later as Colonel Michael S. 'Hooky' Nicobar, who was given the difficult task of repatriating Russians in post-World War II Vienna in the drama film The Red Danube (1949).

Although he continued to make films, including The Bad and the Beautiful (1952) and Forbidden Planet (1956), Pidgeon returned to work on Broadway in the mid-1950s after a 20-year absence. He was featured in Take Me Along with Jackie Gleason and received a Tony Award nomination for the musical play. He continued making films, playing Admiral Harriman Nelson in 1961's Voyage to the Bottom of the Sea, James Haggin in Walt Disney's Big Red (1962), and the Senate Majority Leader in Otto Preminger's Advise & Consent. His role as Florenz Ziegfeld in Funny Girl (1968) was well received. Later, he played Casey, James Coburn's sidekick, in Harry in Your Pocket (1973).

Pidgeon guest-starred in the episode "King of the Valley" (November 26, 1959) of CBS's Dick Powell's Zane Grey Theatre. Pidgeon played Dave King, a prosperous rancher who quarrels with his banker over a $10,000 loan.

His other television credits included Rawhide ("The Reunion", 1962). Breaking Point, The F.B.I., Marcus Welby, M.D., and Gibbsville. In 1963 he guest-starred as corporate attorney Sherman Hatfield in the fourth of four special episodes of Perry Mason while Raymond Burr was recovering from surgery. In 1965, he played the king in Rodgers and Hammerstein's CBS television production of Cinderella, starring Lesley Ann Warren. Pidgeon retired from acting in 1977.

Pidgeon became a United States citizen on December 24, 1943.

Politics
A Republican, in 1944, he joined other celebrity Republicans at a massive rally in the Los Angeles Coliseum arranged by David O. Selznick in support of the Dewey−Bricker ticket as well as Governor Earl Warren of California, who would be Dewey's running mate in 1948. The gathering drew 93,000, with Cecil B. DeMille as the master of ceremonies and short speeches by Hedda Hopper and Walt Disney.

Personal life
Pidgeon married twice. In 1919, he wed the former Edna Muriel Pickles of Annapolis Royal, Nova Scotia, who died in 1926 during the birth of their daughter, also named Edna. In 1931, Pidgeon married his secretary, Ruth Walker, to whom he remained married until he died.

Death
Pidgeon died on September 25, 1984, in Santa Monica, California, two days after his 87th birthday following a series of strokes. He died eight days after Richard Basehart (his TV counterpart in Voyage to the Bottom of the Sea) did.

Walter Pidgeon has a star on the Hollywood Walk of Fame at 6414 Hollywood Blvd.

Complete filmography

Radio appearances

References

External links

 
 
Walter Pidgeon TCM biography

1897 births
1984 deaths
20th-century American male actors
20th-century Canadian male actors
American male film actors
American male radio actors
American male silent film actors
American male stage actors
American male television actors
Canadian emigrants to the United States
Canadian male film actors
Canadian male radio actors
Canadian male silent film actors
Canadian male stage actors
Canadian male television actors
Canadian Expeditionary Force officers
Male actors from New Brunswick
Metro-Goldwyn-Mayer contract players
Musicians from Saint John, New Brunswick
New England Conservatory alumni
Screen Actors Guild Life Achievement Award
Presidents of the Screen Actors Guild
University of New Brunswick alumni
20th-century American singers
20th-century Canadian male singers
University of New Brunswick Faculty of Law alumni
Activists from California
California Republicans
People with acquired American citizenship